On March 27, 2021, one person was killed and six others were injured in a mass stabbing in North Vancouver, British Columbia, Canada. A man named Yannick Bandaogo was arrested and charged with second-degree murder. In September 2021, he was additionally charged with one count of aggravated assault and five counts of attempted murder. His trial is expected to begin in May 2023 in New Westminster.

References

2021 in British Columbia
Crime in British Columbia
Deaths by stabbing in Canada
Mass stabbings in Canada
North Vancouver (district municipality)
Stabbing attacks in 2021
Stabbing attacks in Canada
2021 crimes in Canada
2021 murders in Canada